St Columba's Church is a parish church of the Church of Ireland, located in the village of Drumcliff, County Sligo. It is best known for its association with William Butler Yeats, who was buried in the churchyard in 1948, having previously been buried close to where he died, in France.

The church is also noted for being a fine example of neo-Gothic architecture, having been built using money from the Board of First Fruits in 1809.

References

External links
The Church website

Churches completed in 1809
W. B. Yeats
Church of Ireland church buildings in the Republic of Ireland
Churches in County Sligo
19th-century churches in the Republic of Ireland